Addison Righteous Adam Garnett (born 13 September 1996) is an English semi-professional footballer who last played as a defender for Bedfont Sports.

Garnett originally began his career at local side, Bedfont Sports before joining Football League side Queens Park Rangers in his mid-teens. Following his release from Loftus Road, Garnett began a sports scholarship for Missouri State Bears in the US, before returning to England for a trial with Carlisle United in December 2015. However, manager, Keith Curle opted against signing the former Queens Park Rangers man and he instead joined Isthmian League side Hendon during the closing stages of the 2015–16 season. Garnett then returned to the Football League, to join Crawley Town. He went onto spend two years at the Reds, including a short-term loan spell with Whitehawk, before leaving in January 2018. A month later, he re-joined boyhood club, Bedfont Sports.

Club career
After spells with Bedfont Sports and Queens Park Rangers, Garnett moved to the US to begin a sport scholarship with college side Missouri State Bears in April 2015. In December 2015, Garnett was invited by Carlisle United manager Keith Curle to take part in a one-month trial. However, at the end of the month, Curle opted against signing him. In February 2016, Garnett returned to England to join Isthmian League Premier Division side Hendon. Garnett went onto make ten appearances for Hendon (including London Senior Cup) before leaving for the Football League.

On 13 July 2016, after a successful trial, Garnett joined League Two side Crawley Town on a two-year deal. On 9 November 2016, after struggling with a hamstring injury, Garnett made his long-awaited debut in a 4–0 defeat to Southampton U23's in the EFL Trophy, replacing Chris Arthur at half-time. Three days later, Garnett made his league debut for Crawley, in a 3–1 home defeat against Cambridge United, replacing Mark Connolly in the 44th minute. On 25 August 2017, Garnett joined National League South side Whitehawk on a one-month loan deal. A day later, Garnett made his debut for Whitehawk in their 1–1 draw with Braintree Town, featuring for the entire 90 minutes. On 18 January 2018, it was announced that Garnett's contract with Crawley had been terminated and that he would leave the club.

On 10 February 2018, following his release from Crawley, Garnett returned to boyhood club, Bedfont Sports of the Combined Counties League Premier Division. He went onto make his debut on the same day during their 2–1 away victory over Horley Town, playing the full 90 minutes.

Career statistics

References

External links

1996 births
Living people
Footballers from Feltham
English footballers
Association football defenders
Bedfont Sports F.C. players
Queens Park Rangers F.C. players
Hendon F.C. players
Crawley Town F.C. players
Whitehawk F.C. players
Isthmian League players
English Football League players
National League (English football) players